Derjuginella rufofasciata is a species of sea snail, a marine gastropod mollusk in the family Pyramidellidae, the pyrams and their allies. This species is the only known species to exist within the genus, Derjuginella.

Distribution
This marine species occurs off the coasts of Japan, within the Sea of Japan respectively.

References

External links
 To World Register of Marine Species

Pyramidellidae
Gastropods described in 1875